Battowia or Bettowia is one of the Grenadine islands which lie between the Caribbean islands of Saint Vincent and Grenada.  Politically, it is part of the nation of Saint Vincent and the Grenadines.

Flora and Fauna 
Battowia island is locally known as "Bird island" as it is a roosting and nesting site for a variety of seabirds, in particular  larger birds such as frigatebirds, gulls and boobies and also  brown pelican, brown noddy, sooty tern. As well as land birds such as tropical mockingbird, eared dove, and the Antillean crested hummingbird.

Among other inhabitants of the island are goats and rare Congo snake (Amphiuma) and Barbour's tropical racer (Mastigodryas bruesi).

Battowia Island is declared a Wildlife Reserve.

References

Islands of Saint Vincent and the Grenadines
Private islands of Saint Vincent and the Grenadines